The Antarctic starry skate (Amblyraja georgiana) is a species of fish in the family Rajidae. It lives near the seabed in depths ranging from 20 to 350 m in the south-eastern Pacific near Chile and South Georgia Island. Its maximum length is 1 m. It produces oblong egg capsules that have four sharp thorns in each corner and measure 116.5 mm long and 80.0 mm wide

References

External links
 Species Description of Amblyraja georgiana at www.shark-references.com

Amblyraja
Fish described in 1938